The T-12 sniper rifle is a bolt-action sniper rifle produced for the Turkish Armed Forces by Makina ve Kimya Endüstrisi Kurumu in an effort to replace foreign produced sniper rifles with domestic Turkish products.

External links
 http://www2.ssm.gov.tr/katalog2007/data/24507/7/uruning/uruning13.html

Sniper rifles of Turkey
Bolt-action rifles
5.56×45mm NATO firearms